The beach soccer tournament at the 2023 European Games will be held; the discipline was confirmed to be part of the Games on 30 August 2021. It will be the third edition of beach soccer at the European Games following 2015 and 2019.

Two events will take place: the men's tournament the women's tournament. The former will take place for the third time at the Games, and the latter for the first time. A total of 14 teams will participate (eight in the men's competition and six in the women's).

Portugal are the defending gold medallists of the men's tournament.

Competition schedule
TBA.

Qualification

Men's tournament
Poland qualify automatically as the host country. The remaining teams qualified through the 2022 Euro Beach Soccer League (EBSL). The top six teams of the Superfinal qualified along with the winners of the Promotion Final.

Women's tournament
Poland qualify automatically as the host country. The remaining teams qualified through the 2022 Women's Euro Beach Soccer League (WEBSL). The top five teams of the Superfinal qualified.

Participating NOCs
The following National Olympic Committees (NOCs), as per the outcome of qualification events, will participate (the number of participating athletes of each NOC are shown in parentheses).

Men's competition

Women's competition

Medal summary

Medal table

Medalists

See also
Beach soccer at the 2023 World Beach Games

Notes

References

Sports at the 2023 European Games
European Games
2023
Beach soccer at the 2023 European Games